Mazowe is a village in Mashonaland Central province in Zimbabwe.

Notable people
John Bredenkamp
Fortune Chasi
Chenhanho Chimutengwende
Paul Tangi Mhova Mkondo
Auxilia Mnangagwa
Grace Mugabe
Joseph Msika

References

Populated places in Mashonaland Central Province